The 2020 season was Pohang Steelers' thirty-eighth season in the K League 1 in South Korea. Pohang Steelers competed in the K League 1 and the Korean FA Cup. The club played their first match on May 10th before the league was suspend from February because of the COVID-19 pandemic.

Current squad

Transfer

In

Loan in

Out

Loan out

Coaching staff

Competitions

K League 1

Results summary

Results by round

League table

Matches
All times are Korea Standard Time (KST) – UTC+9

Korean FA Cup

Matches

Squad statistics

Appearances

Goal scorers 
The list is sorted by shirt number when total goals are equal.

Assists

Clean sheets
The list is sorted by shirt number when total clean sheets are equal.

Notes

References

Pohang Steelers
2020